Israel was represented in the Eurovision Song Contest 2005 by Shiri Maimon and the song "HaSheket SheNish'ar". The song was written by Pini Aaronbayev and Eyal Shachar and composed by Pini Aaronbayev.

Before Eurovision

Kdam Eurovision 2005 
The Israeli entry for the Eurovision Song Contest 2005 was selected through Kdam Eurovision 2005, the national final format organised by IBA. The show took place on 2 March 2005 at the Neve Ilan TV Studios in Jerusalem, hosted by Moran Atias and Didi Harrari and broadcast on Channel 1 as well as online via iba.org.il/eurovil.

Competing artists 
IBA invited fourteen artists to participate in the competition. The competing acts were announced on 26 January 2005, while the competing songs were presented during a radio programme on Reshet Gimmel on 15 February 2005.

Final 
The final took place on 2 March 2005. Fourteen entries competed and the winner, "HaSheket SheNish'ar" performed by Shiri Maimon, was selected by a 50/50 combination of the votes from five regional juries and telephone votes from the public divided into five regions.

At Eurovision
Because Israel failed to qualify in 2004 Shiri had to compete in the Eurovision semi-final. The song was presented in English and Hebrew at Eurovision. In the semi-final Shiri performed 7th, following Monaco and preceding Belarus, and qualified for the final, placing 7th with 158 points. In the final she performed 11th following Spain and preceding Serbia and Montenegro, and finished in 4th place with 154 points.

The spokesperson who revealed Israel's votes for other countries was journalist Dana Herman.

Voting

Points awarded to Israel

Points awarded by Israel

References

2005
Countries in the Eurovision Song Contest 2005
Eurovision